Sanem Castle, located in the village of Sanem near Esch-sur-Alzette in south-western Luxembourg has a history dating back to the 13th century. Today's building was completed in 1557 after the medieval castle had been partly destroyed. The castle still maintains much of its original character.

History

There are historic references mentioning a castle in Sanem during the 13th century when it was closely related to the nearby Soleuvre Castle. Originally a typical medieval fortified castle complete with a moat and keep, it was seriously damaged by the French in the 1550s. In about 1567, Frédéric de Hagen-Fleckenstein reconstructed the castle, placing the new buildings around a large rectangular courtyard. The old square-shaped tower dating back to the castle's Gothic origins remained as part of the new complex. The castle is built in the Renaissance style inspired by Italian architecture from the last half of the 15th century. In the 17th century, the castle was burnt, rebuilt and occupied by the Polish troops of the imperial army.

In 1753, Arnold-François von Daun, baron de Tornaco, bought the castle and moved in with great ceremony. Victor de Tornaco who became prime minister of Luxembourg in 1860 was one of its most noteworthy occupants. The castle remained in the hands of the barons of Tornaco until 1950 when Auguste sold it to the Commune of Esch-sur-Alzette. For 50 years, it was then use as a home for children, under the name Kannerschlass. In 1965 a pavilion was constructed in the park next to the castle, which included accommodation for the director of the Kannerschlass.

In 1972, as a result of financial difficulties, it was taken over by the State of Luxembourg. In 1999, the Kannerschlass ceased to occupy the castle, and the building was refurbished.

The castle today

The property is now an orphanage and children's home known as the Kannerschlass or children's castle. It also houses the headquarters of the Centre Virtuel de la Connaissance sur l'Europe (CVCE) . The CVCE is a research and documentation centre which seeks to provide digital access to sources relating to the European integration process.

Gallery

See also
List of castles in Luxembourg

References

Castles in Luxembourg
Esch-sur-Alzette